Faustina Sáez de Melgar, née Faustina Sáez y Soria (1834–1895) was a Spanish writer and journalist. She was mother of the composer and painter .

Biography
Faustina Sáez y Soria began to write her first literary texts at age nine, an activity in which she persisted despite her father's opposition. At seventeen she published her first poem in El Correo de la Moda; a year later she was an assiduous contributor to this and other magazines such as Álbum de Señoritas and Ellas.

She married Valentín Melgar y Chicharro, a state official who would go on to hold various positions in Spain and in colonies such as the Philippines, Cuba, and Puerto Rico. The couple moved to Madrid. There her first son died in 1858. In 1859 her daughter Gloria was born and she published her poetry book La lira del Tajo y África y España, verses on the recent war in Morocco. In 1860 she had her first great success with the novel La pastora del Guadiela. This made her into a celebrity, allowing her to regularly publish extensive narratives and contribute to all types of newspapers and magazines, such as El Trono y la Nobleza, La Antorcha, El Occidente, La Aurora de la Vida, El Museo Literario, El Museo Universal, La Iberia, Los Sucesos, La Mujer, La Ilustración de Madrid, El Recreo de las Familias, La Moda Elegante Ilustrada, El Bazar, El Salón de la Moda, El Resumen, La Edad Dichosa, La Discusión, La Época, El Correo de Ultramar (of Paris), El Siglo (of Havana), and La Concordia (of Caracas). She also founded and directed La Violeta (of Madrid), La Canastilla Infantil, and Paris Charmant Artistique (of Paris). In 1873 her daughter Virginia was born, and in 1880 she moved to Paris.

She presided at the Artistic and Literary Athenaeum of Ladies (1869) and was Vice-President of Honor of the Women's Section of the Chicago World's Fair (1893). She was an active advocate for abolitionism and the so-called feminismo de la diferencia (feminism of difference). That is to say, they did not demand female emancipation, nor equality of rights with men; they simply advocated greater education for women with the sole objective of having basic knowledge to be able to have conversations with their husband, and thus not boring him. They considered this to be the main cause of matrimonial breakups at the time.

Works

Publicist
Faustina Sáez de Melgar was the founder and director of the magazine La Violeta (1862–1866), obligatory subscription publication for the Normal Schools of Teachers and Higher Schools of Girls, by Royal Order of Isabella II. She also held the position of director of other similar publications such as La Mujer, La Canastilla Infantil, and Paris charmant artistique (a French periodical).

Translations
She translated many works, including:
 Los dramas de la bolsa (1884), by Pierre Zaccone
 Los vecinos (1883), by Fredrika Bremer
 La sociedad y sus costumbres (1883), by Madame de Watteville
 Flores y perlas (1889), in which she translated several poetic compositions by Carmen Sylva, Queen consort of Romania

Poetry
 La lira del Tajo (1859)

Narratives
La pastora de Guadiela (Madrid: Bernabé Fernández, 1860), often reprinted
La marquesa de Pinares (Madrid: Bernabé Fernández, 1861), continuation of the above
Los miserables de España o Secretos de la Corte (Barcelona: Vicente Castaños, 1862–63), 2 volumes
Matilde o El ángel de Val de Real (Madrid: Manuel de Rojas, 1862)
La higuera de Villaverde. Leyenda tradicional (Madrid: Imprenta de Bernabé Fernández, 1860).
Ecos de la gloria. Leyendas históricas (Madrid: Antonio Pérez Dubrull, 1863)
Ángela o El ramillete de jazmines (Madrid: R. Vicente, 1865-1866), 3 volumes
Adriana o La quinta de Peralta (Madrid: F. de Rojas, 1866)
La loca del encinar (Madrid: Imprenta J. A. García, 1867)
Amar después de la muerte (Barcelona: Imprenta Verdaguer, 1867). Second part of the novel Adriana o La quinta de Peralta (Madrid, 1866).
La cruz del olivar (Madrid: F. Peña, 1868), novel
"María la cuarterona o La esclavitud en las Antillas" (1868). Text appeared in La Iberia number 24, 24 October 1868. 
Rosa, la cigarrera de Madrid (Barcelona: Imprenta Hispana y Juan Pons, 1872 and 1878, 2 volumes)
"El hogar sin fuego" (La Iberia, 18 July 1876). Was translated into Italian (in a version which was also a significant success)
La abuelita (Barcelona: Librería de Juan y Antonio Bastinos ed., 1877). Stories grouped under the generic pseudonym "Cuentos de aldea").
Inés, o La hija de la caridad (Madrid: Rojas, 1878, 2 volumes)
Sendas opuestas (Madrid: Rojas, 1878). At the end, another narrative by the author: La bendición paterna. 
El collar de esmeraldas (Madrid: Pedro Núñez, 1879).
El deber cumplido (Madrid: Pedro Núñez, 1879). At the end, the novel previously mentioned in La loca del encinar.
Aurora y felicidad (Barcelona: Salvador Manero, 1881). Novel of manners. 
Fulvia o Los primeros cristianos (Madrid, 1889). Historical novel. 
El trovador del Turia (Memorias de una religiosa) (Madrid: Imprenta de "La Guirnalda", 1890). El hogar sin fuego and La bendición paterna were reprinted in the same edition.
Alfonso el Católico (Madrid: Fernando Fe, s. a.)

Theater
Contra indiferencia, celos Madrid: José Rodríguez, 1875, comic play.
La cadena rota (Madrid: F. Macías, 1879). Abolitionist drama in verse.

Articles and essays
"Deberes de la mujer" (Madrid: R. Vicente, 1866)
"Un libro para mis hijas. Educación cristiana y social de la mujer" (Barcelona: Librería de Juan and Antonio Bastinos ed., 1877)
"Epistolario manual para señoritas" (Barcelona: Librería de Juan y Antonio Bastinos ed., 1877)

Anthologies
Páginas para las niñas (Barcelona: Imprenta de J. Jepús, 1881). Official reading book in the Spanish school system by Royal Order of 20 December 1886 and 12 May 1885.
La semana de los niños (París: Ch. Bouret, 1882). "Instructional readings for children". 
Romances históricos y lecturas amenas para los niños de ambos sexos en las escuelas y las señoritas adolescentes (Madrid: Imprenta de Ramón Angulo, 1888)
Las españolas, Americanas y Lusitanas pintadas por sí mismas (1886)

References

Further reading
Carmen Simón Palmer, Escritoras españolas del siglo XIX. Manual biobibliográfico (Madrid: Castalia, 1991)
Blanco, Alda, Escritoras virtuosas: Narradoras de la domesticidad en la España isabelina, Universidad de Granada-Instituto de Estudios de la Mujer, 2001
García Jáñez, F., "Faustina Sáez de Melgar; escritora y 'ángel del hogar', imagen plástico-literaria", Sociedad de Literatura Española del Siglo XIX, III Coloquio: Lectora, heroína, autora (La mujer en la literatura española del siglo XIX) (Barcelona, 23–25 October 2002), ed. V. Trueba, E. Rubio, P. Miret, L.F. Díaz Larios, J.F. Botrel and L. Bonet, Barcelona, University of Barcelona, PPU, 2005, pp. 135-148
Hibbs-Lissorgues, Solange, "Escritoras españolas entre el deber y el deseo: Faustina Sáez de Melgar (1834-1895), Pilar Sinués de Marco (1835-1893) y Antonia Rodríguez de Ureta", La mujer de letras o la letraherida. Discursos y representaciones sobre la mujer escritora en el siglo XIX, ed. Pura Fernández and Marie-Linda Ortega, Madrid, Consejo Superior de Investigaciones Científicas, 2008, pp. 325-343
Sánchez Llama, Íñigo, Galería de escritoras isabelinas. La prensa periódica entre 1833 y 1895, Madrid: Cátedra-Instituto de la Mujer, 2000
Sánchez Llama, Íñigo, "El nacionalismo liberal y su textualización en las letras peninsulares del siglo XIX: el caso de Faustina Sáez de Melgar (1835-1895) y Benito Pérez Galdós (1843-1920)", Revista Hispánica Moderna, LIV.1 (2001), pp. 5-30
Simón Palmer, María del Carmen, Escritoras españolas del siglo XIX. Manual bio-bibliográfico, Madrid: Castalia, 1991
Soubsol, Laure, "Sáez de Melgar, Faustina", Diccionario histórico de la traducción en España, ed. Francisco Lafarga and Luis Pegenaute. Madrid: Gredos, 2009, p. 999

External links
 Works of Faustina Sáez de Melgar at the Biblioteca Virtual Cervantes

1834 births
1895 deaths
19th-century Spanish dramatists and playwrights
19th-century Spanish poets
Spanish abolitionists
French–Spanish translators
Italian–Spanish translators
Writers from the Community of Madrid
Spanish translators
Spanish women journalists
Spanish women novelists
Spanish women poets
Swedish–Spanish translators
19th-century Spanish women writers
19th-century journalists
19th-century translators
Spanish magazine founders